Hiorra is an unincorporated community in Preston County, in the U.S. state of West Virginia.

History
A post office called Hiorra was established in 1902, and remained in operation until 1918. The community's name is an amalgamation of the names of three businessmen in the local mining industry.

References

Unincorporated communities in Preston County, West Virginia
Unincorporated communities in West Virginia